Glenn Robert Buchanan (born 19 November 1962) is an Australian former butterfly swimmer of the 1980s who won two bronze medals in the 100-metre butterfly and the 4x100-metre medley relay, at the 1984 Summer Olympics in Los Angeles.

Pitted against the United States' world record-holder Pablo Morales and West Germany's Michael Gross, Buchanan swam at such a pace in a vain attempt to keep up that he broke the Australian record, finishing 0.77 of a second behind Gross, who set a new world record. Each of the first six finishers had improved their respective national records. Buchanan then combined with Mark Stockwell, Peter Evans and Mark Kerry to claim another bronze in the 4x100-metre medley relay.

Buchanan continues to reside in Townsville and runs a swim school.

See also
 List of Olympic medalists in swimming (men)

References
 

1962 births
Living people
Olympic swimmers of Australia
Swimmers at the 1984 Summer Olympics
Sportspeople from Townsville
Olympic bronze medalists in swimming
Australian male butterfly swimmers
Medalists at the 1984 Summer Olympics
Olympic bronze medalists for Australia
20th-century Australian people